Horaga selina, the Selina's onyx, is  a species of lycaenid or hairstreak butterfly found in Sulawesi, Indonesia.

Range
H. selina is endemic to Sulawesi. It was first found in the central region and was known until 1985 from only a single holotype specimen. It has since been found in the southern region and also in the Bogani Nani Wartabone National Park, northern Sulawesi, during the Royal Entomological Society's 1985 Project Wallace expedition.

See also
List of butterflies of India
List of butterflies of India (Lycaenidae)

Cited references

Horaga
Butterflies described in 1895